5'-Guanylyl imidodiphosphate (GDPNP) is a purine nucleotide.  It is an analog of guanosine triphosphate in which one of the oxygen atoms is replaced with an amine, producing a non-hydrolyzable functional group. Guanylyl imidodiphosphate binds tightly to G-proteins in the presence of Mg2+. Guanylyl imidodiphosphate is a potent stimulator of adenylate cyclase.  It is often used in studies of protein synthesis.

References

Nucleotides
Purines
Organophosphates